Cultural Cold War refers to propaganda campaigns waged by both the United States and the Soviet Union during the Cold War, with each country promoting their own culture, arts, literature, and music. In addition, less overtly, their opposing political choices and ideologies at the expense of the other. Many of the battles were fought in Europe or in European Universities, with Communist Party leaders depicting the United States as a cultural black hole while pointing to their own cultural heritage as proof that they were the inheritors of the European Enlightenment. The U.S. responded by accusing the Soviets of "disregarding the inherent value of culture," and subjugating art to the controlling policies of a totalitarian political system, even as they felt saddled with the responsibility of preserving and fostering western civilization's best cultural traditions, given the many European artists who took refuge in the United States before, during, and after World War II.

History

Role of the CIA and the CCF 

In 1950, the Central Intelligence Agency (CIA) surreptitiously created the Congress for Cultural Freedom (CCF) to counter the Cominform's "peace offensive." At its peak, the Congress had "offices in thirty-five countries, employed dozens of personnel, published over twenty prestige magazines, held art exhibitions, owned a news and features service, organized high-profile international conferences, and rewarded musicians and artists with prizes and public performances." The point of these endeavors was to "showcase" U.S. and European high culture, including not just musical works but paintings, ballets, and other artistic avenues, for the benefit of nonaligned foreign intellectuals.

CCF and the realm of music
Many U.S. government organizations used American music to persuade audiences worldwide that the U.S. was a cradle for the growth of music. The CIA and, in turn the CCF, were reluctant to patronize America's musical avant-garde, which included artists such experimental musicians as Milton Babbitt and John Cage. The CCF took a more conservative approach, as outlined under its General Secretary, Nicolas Nabokov, and concentrated its efforts on presenting older European works that had been banned or condemned by the Communist Party.

In 1952, the CCF sponsored the Festival of Twentieth-Century Masterpieces of Modern Arts in Paris. Over the next thirty days, the festival hosted nine separate orchestras which performed works by over 70 composers, many of whom had been dismissed by communist critics as "degenerate" and "sterile," including composers such as Dmitri Shostakovich and Claude Debussy. The festival opened with a performance of Stravinsky's The Rite of Spring, as performed by the Boston Symphony Orchestra. Thomas Braden, a senior member of the CIA said: "The Boston Symphony Orchestra won more acclaim for the U.S. in Paris than John Foster Dulles or Dwight D. Eisenhower could have brought with a hundred speeches".

The CIA, in particular, used a wide range of musical genres, including Broadway musicals, and even the jazz of Dizzy Gillespie, to convince music enthusiasts across the globe that the U.S. was committed to the musical arts as much as they were to the literary and visual arts. Under the leadership of Nabokov, the CCF organized impressive musical events that were anti-communist in nature, transporting America's prime musical talents to Berlin, Paris, and London to provide a steady series of performances and festivals. In order to promote cooperation between artists and the CCF, and thus extend their ideals, the CCF provided financial aid to artists in need of monetary assistance.

However, because the CCF failed to offer much support for classical music associated with the likes of Bach, Mozart, and Beethoven, it was deemed an “authoritarian” tool of Soviet communism and wartime German and Italian fascism. The CCF also distanced itself from experimental musical avant-garde artists such as Milton Babbit and John Cage, preferring to focus on earlier European works that had been banned or condemned as "formalist" by Soviet authorities.

CIA and music composition

Correction to the above claims: 

"The CIA covertly funded the Darmstadt Summer Course, which retaught composers of Abstract Expressionism, epitomized by the Schoenberg/Berg/Webern school of twelve-tone or scientific "intellectual" music. Initially, the goal was to break down Nazi propaganda such as post-Wagnerians as Strauss and Pfitzner that were favored by broad audiences." 

First, the CIA provided partial funding for awhile to the Darmstadt Summer Course, but after awhile it didn't. It's still around, 70 years later. 99% of what constitutes the history of this festival essentially has pretty much nothing to do with the CIA.

Second, Abstract Expressionism was never taught at the Darmstadt Festival, because Abstract Expressionism was a style of painting, and the Darmstadt Festival was a music festival. 

Third, the early years of the Darmstadt festival, which is when it received some funding from the CIA, primarily consisted of works *not* by Schoenberg, Berg, or Webern. Tonal composers such as Hindemith and Milhaud were frequently performed in the early years (see https://www.jstor.org/stable/831871).

Nicolas Nabokov, Secretary General of the CCF

Nicolas Nabokov was a Russian-born composer and writer who developed CCF's music program while serving as the organization's Secretary-General. His compositions include several notable musical works, the first of which was the ballet-oratorio Ode, produced by Serge Diaghilev's Ballet Russe de Monte Carlo, in 1928 and Lyrical Symphony in 1931. Nabokov moved to the U.S. in 1933 to serve as a lecturer in music for the Barnes Foundation. A year after moving to the U.S., Nabokov composed the ballet Union Pacific. He went on to teach music at Wells College in New York from 1936 to 1941, and later at St. John's College in Maryland. In 1939, Nabokov officially became a U.S citizen.

In 1945, Nabokov moved to Germany to work for the U.S. Strategic Bombing Survey as a civilian cultural adviser. He returned to the U.S. just two years later to teach at the Peabody Conservatory before becoming the Secretary-General of the newly created CCF in 1951. Nabokov remained in this position for over fifteen years, spearheading popular music and cultural festivals during his tenure. During this time he also wrote music for the opera Rasputin's End in 1958 and was commissioned by the New York City Ballet to compose music for Don Quixote in 1966. When the CCF disbanded in 1967, Nabokov returned to a career in teaching at several universities throughout the U.S., and composed music for the opera Love's Labour's Lost in 1973.

Festival of Twentieth-Century Masterpieces of Modern Arts

This 30-day arts festival, held in Paris, was sponsored by the CCF in 1952 in order to alter the image of the U.S. as having a bleak and empty cultural scene. The CCF under Nabokov believed that American modernist culture could serve as an ideological resistance to the Soviet Union. As a result, the CCF commissioned nine different orchestras to perform concertos, operas, and ballets by over 70 composers who had been labeled by communist commissars as "degenerate" and "sterile." This included compositions by Benjamin Britten, Erik Satie, Arnold Schoenberg, Alban Berg, Pierre Boulez, Gustav Mahler, Paul Hindemith, and Claude Debussy. 

The festival opened with a performance of Igor Stravinsky's Rite of Spring, conducted by Stravinsky and Pierre Monteux, the original conductor in 1913 when the ballet instigated a riot by the Parisian public. The entire Boston Symphony Orchestra was brought to Paris to perform the overture for the large sum of $160,000. The performance was so powerful in uniting the public under a common anti-Soviet stance that American journalist Tom Braden remarked that "the Boston Symphony Orchestra won more acclaim for the U.S. in Paris than John Foster Dulles or Dwight D. Eisenhower could have brought with a hundred speeches." An additional revolutionary performance at the festival was Virgil Thomson's Four Saints, an opera that contained an all-black cast. This performance was selected to counter European criticisms of the treatment of African Americans living in the U.S.

Louis Armstrong and the Cultural Cold War

During the Cold War, Louis Armstrong was promoted around the world as a symbol of US culture, racial progress, and foreign policy. It was during the Jim Crow Era that Armstrong was appointed a Goodwill Jazz Ambassador, and his job entailed representing the American government's commitment to advance the liberties of African Americans at home, while also working to endorse the social freedom of those abroad.

Armstrong's visit to Africa's Gold Coast was hugely successful and attracted magnificent crowds and widespread press coverage. His band's performance in Accra resulted in public enthusiasm due to what was deemed an "unbiased support for the African course".

Although Armstrong was indeed advocating the US foreign policy strategies in Africa, he did not whole-heartedly agree with some of the American government's decisions in the South. During the 1957 school desegregation crisis in Little Rock, Arkansas, Armstrong made it a point to openly criticize President Eisenhower and Arkansas Governor Orval Faubus. Instigated by Faubus's decision to use the National Guard to prevent Black students from integrating into Little Rock High School, Armstrong abandoned his ambassadorship periodically, jeopardizing the US's attempt to use Armstrong to represent America's racial position abroad, specifically in the Soviet Union. 

It was not until Eisenhower sent federal troops to uphold integration that Armstrong reconsidered and went back to his position with the State Department. Although he had deserted his trip to the Soviet Union, he later went on to tour several times for the US government, including a six-month tour African tour in 1960–1961. It was during this time that Armstrong continued to criticize the American government for dragging its feet on the Civil Rights issue, highlighting the contradictory nature of the Goodwill Jazz Ambassadors' mission. Armstrong and Dave and Iona Brubeck (other Ambassadors at the time) asserted that although they represented the American government, they did not represent all of the same policies.

Ultimately, although America no doubt benefited from the tours by Black artists (including Duke Ellington and Dizzy Gillespie), these ambassadors did not advocate a singularly American identity. They instead encouraged solidarity among Black people, and were constantly contesting those policies that did not fully sympathize with the aims of the civil rights movement.

See also
 American National Exhibition 
 Herbert Marcuse – OSS agent and revisionist New Left pioneer
 Gloria Steinem – second-wave feminist pioneer
 A Beacon of Hope
 CIA influence on public opinion

References

Further reading
 Appy, Christian G. Cold War Constructions: The Political Culture of United States Imperialism, 1945–1966. Culture, Politics, and the Cold War. Amherst: The University of Massachusetts Press, 2000. 
 Klein, Michael. An American Half-century: Postwar Culture and Politics in the USA. London & Boulder, Colorado: Pluto Press, 1994. 
 Rubin, Andrew N. Archives of Authority: Empire, Culture, and the Cold War. Princeton: Princeton University Press, 2012. 
 Saunders, Frances Stonor. Introduction to Who Paid the Piper? The CIA and the Cultural Cold War. Granta 1999/2000. 

Central Intelligence Agency
Cold War
CIA-funded propaganda
Propaganda in the United States